Allison W. Hough was a state legislator in South Carolina. He represented Kershaw County, South Carolina in the South Carolina House of Representatives from 1872 to 1874.

See also
African-American officeholders during and following the Reconstruction era

References

African-American politicians during the Reconstruction Era
People from Kershaw County, South Carolina
Members of the South Carolina House of Representatives